Rajesh Nandini Singh  (23 March 1957 – 8 May 2016) was an Indian politician who belonged to the Indian National Congress party. She was born in the village Birra, Janjgir-Champa district, Chhattisgarh the third child of Diwan Durgeshwar Singh, Zamindar of Birra and Rajkumari Bhanu Kumari Devi from royal house of Ambagarh Chauki. In the 2009 election she was elected to the 15th Lok Sabha from the Shahdol Lok Sabha constituency of Madhya Pradesh.
She was earlier member of Madhya Pradesh Legislative assembly during 1993–1998.

She was married to Dalbir Singh, who was also a politician. After his death, she continued to maintain the family's involvement in politics. She had one daughter and one son. Her daughter Himadri Singh contested the Lok Sabha by-poll from Shahdol unsuccessfully in November 2016.

Rajesh Nandini Singh died of heart attack in May 2016, at the age of 59.

References

External links
 Fifteenth Lok Sabha Members Bioprofile in Lok Sabha website

India MPs 2009–2014
1967 births
2016 deaths
People from Madhya Pradesh
People from Anuppur district
Indian National Congress politicians
People from Bilaspur district, Chhattisgarh
People from Shahdol district
Madhya Pradesh MLAs 1993–1998
Lok Sabha members from Madhya Pradesh
People from Janjgir-Champa district
State cabinet ministers of Madhya Pradesh
Indian National Congress politicians from Madhya Pradesh